Julio César Córdova Martínez (born 23 March 1963) is a Mexican politician affiliated with the Institutional Revolutionary Party. As of 2014 he served as Deputy of the LIX Legislature of the Mexican Congress representing Sonora.

References

1963 births
Living people
Politicians from Sonora
Institutional Revolutionary Party politicians
21st-century Mexican politicians
People from Caborca
National Autonomous University of Mexico alumni
Deputies of the LIX Legislature of Mexico
Members of the Chamber of Deputies (Mexico) for Sonora